Goujounac is a commune in the Lot department in south-western France.

Geography
Goujounac is located in the Lot valley about 30 km to the west of Cahors and 9 km south of Cazals.

Sights
Architecturally, Goujounac is very traditional in style and therefore akin to many of the villages in this corner of the Lot. Presenting pretty, well-preserved stone houses and barns along the main road with further reaches of the village also well maintained, the village has a number of simply preserved back streets to wander. The centre of the village is dominated by its ancient 12th century Romanesque church, evidence in itself that Goujounac has been a community for many years.

Demographics
Most of the village's 250 population are French, though there are Portuguese, British, Belgian and Dutch living here and in nearby areas now as well.

The village is a quiet place in the evenings and it sees much passing trade during the day throughout the summer as it is situated on the D660 which runs north to south. Although the road occasionally becomes fairly busy during the peak tourist months, traffic never becomes sufficiently heavy to be considered a disturbance. As with many places around here, its population increases with the coming of summer and 'les grandes vacances', but its quiet charm never really succumbs at all.

Amenities
There is a swimming pool and a campsite with tennis courts at the top of the village, about 5 minutes walk from the centre.  There has been no commercial centre to Goujounac.

See also
Communes of the Lot department

References

Communes of Lot (department)